Stanisław Tadeusz Huskowski (born 24 April 1953 in Wrocław) is a Polish politician. He was elected to Sejm on 25 September 2005, getting 12,334 votes in 3 Wrocław district as a candidate from the Civic Platform list.

He was also a member of Senate 2001-2005.

See also
Members of Polish Sejm 2005-2007

External links
Stanisław Tadeusz Huskowski - parliamentary page - includes declarations of interest, voting record, and transcripts of speeches.

Members of the Polish Sejm 2005–2007
Civic Platform politicians
1953 births
Living people
Members of the Polish Sejm 2007–2011
Members of the Polish Sejm 2011–2015
Mayors of Wrocław